Grass jelly, also known as leaf jelly or herb jelly, is a jelly-like dessert eaten in East and Southeast Asia. It is created by using Chinese mesona (a member of the mint family) and has a mild, slightly bitter taste. It is served chilled, with other toppings such as fruit, or in bubble tea or other drinks. Outside Asia, it is sold in Asian supermarkets.

Nutritional value
Unsweetened grass jelly contains, per 500 grams, 2.5 grams of protein and about 15 grams of carbohydrates, of which 0.5 grams are from dietary fiber. Grass jelly has no fat, vitamins, or minerals.

Preparation
Grass jelly is made by boiling the aged and slightly oxidized stalks and leaves of Platostoma palustre (Mesona chinensis) with potassium carbonate for several hours with a little starch and then cooling the liquid to a jelly-like consistency. This jelly can be cut into cubes or other forms, and then mixed with syrup to produce a drink or dessert thought to have cooling (yin) properties, which makes it typically consumed during hot weather. The jelly itself is fragrant, with a smoky undertone, and is a translucent dark brown, sometimes perceived to be black. Food coloring may sometimes be added to make it darker.

Preparation of other variants, known as green grass jelly, requires no cooking or heating process, only a mixture of leaf extracts and water. Jelly produced in this way has been described as having a leafy neutral or plain flavor.

Regional

Mainland China, Hong Kong and Macau
In Mainland China, Hong Kong and Macau, grass jelly was traditionally served with sugar syrup. Now it is often served mixed with other ingredients, such as mango, sago, watermelon, cantaloupe, and other fresh or canned fruit, and condensed or evaporated milk.

Although this dish is sometimes called liangfen (leung fan) in Chinese, it should not be confused with the Chinese starch jelly liangfen, which is an entirely different dish.

Taiwan
In Taiwan, grass jelly is known as 仙草 (xian cao), and is used in various desserts and drinks. It can sometimes be added to boba drinks and shaved ice (刨冰). It is also commonly used in a traditional Taiwanese dessert, where the jelly is heated and melted to be consumed as a thick pudding-like dessert (燒仙草), with numerous toppings like tangyuan, taro balls, azuki beans, and tapioca. The plant is also made into mesona tea (仙草茶).

Indonesia

Grass jelly is known as cincau in Indonesian. It is also known as camcao, juju, janggelan or kepleng in Javanese, camcauh in Sundanese, and daluman in Bali. Black jelly (cincau hitam) is manufactured as an instant powder, like other instant jellies or agar. This form is easier to use. It is made from the leaves of Platostoma palustre (Mesona palustris).

There are other plants that were used in Indonesia to make grass jelly. They are Melastoma polyanthum, known as cincau perdu, and Cyclea barbata, known as cincau hijau or green grass jelly, and Cocculus orbiculatus or known as cincau Cina or Chinese green grass jelly.  Some plants from genus Stephania such as Stephania hernandifolia (also known as Stephania japonica) and Stephania capitata are also being used as a substitute to create green grass jelly called cincau minyak or oily grass jelly.

Usually, the process of making Indonesian green grass jelly doesn't require a cooking or heating process. Mixing leaf extract and water with the addition of a period of waiting time for coagulation at mild room temperature is enough.

Indonesian green grass jelly has a distinct flavor compared to black grass jelly. It is absent of smoky flavor, almost no bitter taste, and has a mild leafy flavor. Due to its plain neutral flavor, it is usually consumed with sugar water, syrup, coconut milk, and ice.

Malaysia, Singapore and Brunei
Plain grass jelly is mixed in various kinds of desserts, such as ais kacang and cendol. It is also mixed with cold soy milk and served as a refreshing drink/dessert, a drink known as Michael Jackson in South-East Asia (a reference to Michael Jackson's changing skin color and/or the song "Black or White").
Various combinations of grass jelly with rose flavoured syrup added to milk (bandung) are called "bandung cincau" or "bancau" for short. There is also shaved ice with grass jelly toppings. It can be green or brown.

Philippines

Grass jelly (Philippine: gulaman) bricks are used in the various Philippine refreshments or desserts such as sago’t gulaman, buko-pandan, agar flan or halo-halo. It may also be used in fruit salads.

Thailand
In Thailand, grass jelly is known as chaokuai like the Teochew (from Hokkien ). It is commonly served relatively plain together with ice and natural brown sugar. Additionally, it can also be served with fruits such as jackfruit, the fruit of the toddy palm or mixed with other Thai desserts.

Vietnam
In Vietnamese, grass jelly is sương sáo or thạch sương sáo. Grass jelly is chopped in small cubes and served as an additional ingredient in sweet desserts made from various kinds of beans  (chè). There are two common kinds of grass jelly in Vietnam which are Platostoma palustre (Mesona chinensis, called sương sáo in Vietnamese) and Tiliacora triandra (called sương sâm; sương sa or rau câu is the name for jelly made from various kinds of algae). It is common now to eat green grass jelly (thạch lá găng) with douhua (tào phớ) and grass jelly (sương sáo or thạch đen) in the summer.

Mauritius 
In Mauritius, the grass jelly is cut into cubes and is added into water and sugar or in syrup water to make a cold drink called "Mousse Noir" which is literally translated as "black jelly" in English. The Mousse noir is of Chinese origins and is a reflection of the Sino-Mauritians influence on the Mauritian cuisine. The mousse noir is well-known and well-appreciated by Mauritians. It can be made at home, or it can be purchased in local supermarkets where it is widely accessible. The mousse noir is also manufactured by local Mauritian companies, such as Sunny Food Canners, and can be found in the original flavour or can come in different flavours; such as coffee, aloe vera, and melon.

See also

Aiyu jelly
Mesona
Guilinggao
Liangfen
Jidou liangfen
List of Chinese desserts
List of desserts

References

 

Jams and jellies
Bruneian cuisine
Cambodian desserts
Chinese desserts
Indonesian desserts
Indonesian drinks
Malaysian cuisine
Philippine desserts
Singaporean cuisine
Taiwanese cuisine
Thai desserts and snacks
Vietnamese cuisine
Mauritian cuisine
Non-alcoholic drinks
Snack foods